Acompáñame, is a Mexican telenovela produced by Irene Sabido for Televisa in 1977. The show stars Silvia Derbez, Kitty de Hoyos, and Magda Guzmán.

Cast 
 Silvia Derbez as Amanda
 Kitty de Hoyos as Raquel
 Magda Guzmán as Esperanza
 Marta Aura as Angustias
 Fernando Larrañaga as Esteban
 Carlos Monden as Octavio
 Raúl "Chato" Padilla as Efrén
 Martha Zavaleta as Yolanda
 Elizabeth Dupeyrón as Rita
 María Rojo as Martha
 Jorge Ortiz de Pinedo as Federico
 Tony Carbajal as Dr. Beltrán
 Octavio Galindo as Alberto
 Maya Ramos as María Luisa
 Silvia Mariscal as Adriana
 Ramón Arauza as Fabián
 Lili Inclán as Flavia
 Zully Keith as Mercedes
 Laura Zapata as Karla
 Guillermo Gil as Jesús
 Lourdes Canale as Estela
 Jorge Lavat as Doctor
 Dolores Beristáin as Vecina
 Blanca Torres as Trabajadora social
 Eduardo Rojas as Cacomixtle

References

External links 

Mexican telenovelas
1977 telenovelas
Televisa telenovelas
Spanish-language telenovelas
1977 Mexican television series debuts
1977 Mexican television series endings